Commission v United Kingdom (or Commission of the European Communities v United Kingdom of Great Britain and Northern Ireland) refers to several different cases heard by the European Court of Justice, which the European Commission brought against the United Kingdom for infringing European Union law. This includes breach of the Treaty on the Functioning of the European Union (TFEU), or a failure to implement European Union Directives:

Commission v United Kingdom (1979) Case 128/78, the UK failed to implement art 21 of the Tachograph Regulation 1463/70, art 4 (now repealed) on time.
Commission v United Kingdom (1981) Case 804/79, the UK failed to obey exclusive competence of the EU regarding conversation measures in fishing.
Commission v United Kingdom (2003) C-98/01, on golden shares in BAA plc.
Commission v United Kingdom (C-484/04) (2006) C-484/04, it was unlawful for the UK government to advise that the right to a 20-minute break in a 6-hour shift did not need to be provided by employers under the WTD 2003

See also
Commission v France (disambiguation)
Commission v Germany (disambiguation)
Commission v Italy (disambiguation)
Commission v Ireland (disambiguation)

Court of Justice of the European Union case law